is a Special Ambassador for Peacebuilding of Japan.
She was a Japanese politician of the Liberal Democratic Party (LDP), a member of the House of Representatives in the Diet (national legislature). A native of Otaru, Hokkaido and graduate of Tsuda College, she was elected to the House of Representatives for the first time in 1996 as a member of the New Frontier Party. She later joined the LDP.

She is a Senior Diplomatic Fellow, Cambridge Central Asia Forum and By-fellow of Churchill College, Cambridge University as well as visiting professor at the Graduate School of Hokkaido University, the United Nations University and currently Tenjin Foreign Studies University. She has also been a Senior Visiting Researcher at St. Antony's College, Oxford University and at the Center for Strategic and International Studies.
She has served as the Member of the House of Representatives of Japan as well as Parliamentary Vice-Minister for Foreign Affairs, Director of the Committee of Foreign Affairs, Director General of the Women's Bureau of Liberal Democratic Party, etc.
Her areas of expertise include International Peacebuilding and Preventive State Theory, International Negotiation and Strategic Studies, and Intercultural Studies. On these and other subjects, she has written and lectured extensively and internationally. She has published many books such as “Think, or Sink: Preventive State Theory”, “Toward the Future: Human Security”, “From the Window of Oxford”, etc. She was awarded by OISCA for ‘Contribution to Asia’ and Soroptimist Japan for ‘International Contribution’. 
She is currently working on Human Development for Peacebuilding, and on Human Security, especially water security, food security and energy security as well as on Natural and Human Induced Disaster Prevention and Mitigation.

References 
 

1945 births
Living people
People from Otaru
Female members of the House of Representatives (Japan)
Members of the House of Representatives (Japan)
New Frontier Party (Japan) politicians
20th-century Japanese politicians
Liberal Democratic Party (Japan) politicians
Tsuda University alumni
21st-century Japanese politicians
21st-century Japanese women politicians
20th-century Japanese women politicians